The Student Peace Prize Secretariat is a voluntary student organisation in Trondheim that administers the Student Peace Prize selection process. The Secretariat is part of the ISFiT system, and is guided by statutes that are administrated by the ISFiT Foundation, a body consisting of representatives from six large institutions in Trondheim: the Norwegian University of Science and Technology (NTNU), Sør-Trøndelag University College (HiST), the Student Society in Trondheim, the Student Welfare Organisation in Trondheim, Trondheim Municipality and Sør-Trøndelag County Municipality.

Student awards
no:Sekretariatet for Studentenes Fredspris